Markku Huhtamo (born 10 August 1946, in Rovaniemi, Finland) is a Finnish actor.

Huhtamo entered film in 1977 and has appeared in over 30 Finnish films and TV series between then and the present although mostly in film.

Huhtamo starred in the 1977 film alongside actors Antti Litja and Kauko Helovirta in Jäniksen vuosi a film about a Finnish man from Helsinki who leaves to find a new life in the wilderness.

His last appearance was in 2005 in Lapaus.

For videogames, he has given the Finnish voice to Master Eon, a major character in the Skylanders reboot series of the Spyro the Dragon franchise.

External links

1946 births
Living people
People from Rovaniemi
Finnish male video game actors
Finnish male voice actors
20th-century Finnish male actors
21st-century Finnish male actors
Finnish male film actors
Finnish male television actors